Christopher Duncan may refer to:

 Christopher Duncan (Brookside) (active 1986–1988), character on Brookside
 Christopher B. Duncan (born 1964), American actor
 Chris Duncan (1981–2019), American baseballer
 C Duncan (born 1989), Scottish composer and singer